So You Think You Can Dance is a franchise of reality television shows in which contestants compete in dance.  The first series of the franchise, created by Idols producers Simon Fuller and Nigel Lythgoe, premiered in July 2005 and has broadcast sixteen seasons since.  Adaptations of the show began airing in other countries in late 2005 and to date 30 localized adaptations have been produced, representing 41 different countries and comprising more than ninety individual seasons.

Format
Although each varies in the particulars of its format and presentation, all shows in the So You Think You Can Dance franchise share a premise of placing dancers-—who come from a wide variety of dance backgrounds and are often amateur or semi-professional in experience—-in a competition which requires them to adapt to multiple styles of dance.  As the competition progresses, a combination of judge decisions and at-home-viewer votes determine which dancers will advance in the competition from week to week, until ultimately one dancer is voted champion of that particular season and receives a prize package that may consist of money, work or training opportunities, additional material prizes, and typically the title of the respective country's "Favorite Dancer" (e.g. "America's Favorite Dancer").

A show in the franchise is typically composed of three phases of competition: initial open auditions, callbacks/finalist selection, and finals/live performance shows.  A given series or season may air only one show per week or two, but rarely more.  The initial open auditions are typically held at various locations throughout the relevant country and are open to dancers of varied backgrounds and experience levels, though generally there is an age cap (with the age limits being non-consistent between entries in the franchise).  Although usually unseen in the final aired edit of the show, some productions may also hold producer auditions, in which the initial talent pool is screened, before the televised auditions.  The open auditions are overseen by a panel of judges, typically experts in dance or the entertainment field, who will select a portion of auditioning dancers to advance in the competition.  The following stage, sometimes called the "callbacks", "boot camp", or "academy" will further reduce this remaining pool of dancers down to the season's "finalists", usually by putting the dancers through a series of short dance workshops and routines while the judges evaluate their capabilities, adaptability, and over-all potential for the competition.  The callback phase ends when the judge's panel selects a number of season finalists (typically between ten and twenty total dancers, half women and half men).

Collectively the auditions and callbacks, being edited down considerably, represent only a minority of episodes and are televised during the first few weeks of a season.  Following these episodes are the finals (referred to in some entries as "performance shows" or "live shows"), in which the remaining contestants are matched into couples and are assigned new dance styles—-typically, but not always, assigned by a luck-of-the-draw system—each week.  These episodes combine stage performances (including solos, duets, and group routines), short "behind-the-scenes" video packets of the dancers working with their choreographers and each other to master the routines, and judge evaluations of the performances to form the bulk of their run-time, occasionally supplemented by guest performances.  These episodes are also the point at which at-home-viewers begin their involvement in the show: their votes (combined with judge decisions) will decide which dancers remain in the competition as eliminations reduce the number of contestants weekly until a finale episode in which the winner is revealed.  While most of the above are elements shared by all shows in the franchise, entries vary considerably in the details: the number of finalists, the number of shows per week, the manner in which judge decisions are weighted against home-viewer votes, the styles of dance assigned,  presentation style, production values, and even the number of winners are all examples of elements of the format that have fluctuated throughout the run of the franchise.

Dance styles
The following is a non-exhaustive list of dance styles which have been featured on shows within the So You Think You Can Dance franchise, with notes on nomenclature between versions. Only styles featured in choreographed duet or group routines during the competition phase of the show are listed here; styles featured only in solos or auditions are not listed.

Franchise index
Color Key:
 Ongoing  
 Discontinued  
 Forthcoming

International competition
In March 2014, CCTV broadcast a promotional episode in which notable dancers from the U.S. and Chinese versions of So You Think You Can Dance competed directly against one-another as teams.  Titled Zhōngměi Wǔ Lín Guànjūn Duìkàngsài - Super Dancer Born Tonight, the show was shot in Las Vegas but has yet to see a release or announcement in the U.S..   The episode featured head-to-head competition between "all-stars" in the form of solos and duets and was judged by an international panel.

The Next Generation
In 2013, the producers of the Dutch version of So You Think You Can Dance announced a spin-off series, titled So You Think You Can Dance: The Next Generation, featuring dancers younger than those typically featured on the traditional entries in the franchise.  The spin off lasted only one season. In 2016, producers adapted a similar format for the 13th season of the American series,  with competitors between the ages of 8 and 13.  Starting in 2021, a Polish revival of the show also uses an iteration of this format.

See also
Dance on television

Similar shows
 The Ultimate Dance Battle
 Live to Dance/Got to Dance
 America's Best Dance Crew
 Superstars of Dance
 Dance India Dance
 Se Ela Dança, Eu Danço

 
2005 television series debuts
Reality television series franchises